Darkcore (also referred to as darkside hardcore) is a genre of electronic dance music, considered to be a subgenre of breakbeat hardcore, which came out from the UK rave scene of the early 1990s; this genre in particular emerged from late 1992. It is recognised as being one of the direct precursors of the music genre now known as drum and bass.

Origins
By late 1992, breakbeat hardcore was beginning to fragment, and darkcore was one of the subgenres to emerge, in contrast with 4-beat. Darkcore is often characterised by dark-themed samples such as horror movie elements, cries for help, sinister sounding stabs and synthesizer notes, along with syncopated breakbeats in addition to 4-to-the-floor beats and low frequency basslines. It also saw the introduction of effects such as pitch shifting and time stretching to create mood.

Notable releases
Notable releases include Top Buzz's "Living in the Darkness" (Basement, 1993), DJ Hype's "Shot in the Dark" (Suburban Base, 1993), Origin Unknown's "Valley of the Shadows" (RAM Records, 1993), Ed Rush's "Bloodclot Artattack" (No U Turn, 1993), Rufige Cru's "Terminator" (Reinforced Records, 1992), Doc Scott's "Here Comes the Drumz" (Reinforced Records, 1992), 4hero's "Journey from the Light" (Reinforced Records, 1993), and Omni Trio's "Feel Good" (Moving Shadow, 1993).

See also
 Breakbeat hardcore
 Jungle
 Drum and bass

References

Further reading
 Simon Reynolds, Energy Flash: a Journey Through Rave Music and Dance Culture, Picador 1998

Rave
Breakbeat hardcore
20th-century music genres
English styles of music
Dark music genres
Breakbeat genres
Hardcore music genres
1990s in music